Police Academy: The Series is a sitcom series that was a spin-off from the Police Academy series of films. Michael Winslow was the only actor from the Police Academy films to have a recurring role on the show, although several of the film's cast made occasional guest appearances. The series was written by Paul Maslansky and produced by James Margellos and Gary M. Goodman and aired in syndication from September 27, 1997, until May 23, 1998.

Cast 
 Matt Borlenghi as Cadet Richard Casey (26 episodes), who is similar to Carey Mahoney and Nick Lassard.  Like Mahoney, Casey is a repeat offender who chose the Academy instead of jail.  
 Rod Crawford as Sergeant Rusty Ledbetter (19 episodes), who is similar to Harris and Mauser; he wants to discredit Casey and his friends to get them thrown out of the academy.
 Toby Proctor as Cadet Dirk Tackleberry (20 episodes) who is a nephew of Eugene Tackleberry, who is Dirk's idol.
 Jeremiah Birkett as Cadet Dean Tackleberry (20 episodes) who is a nephew of Eugene Tackleberry, who is Dean's idol.
 Heather Campbell as Cadet Annie Metford (20 episodes)
 Christine Gonzales as Alicia Conchita Montoya Cervantes (17 episodes)
 Tony Longo as Cadet Luke Kackley (19 episodes) who is similar to House Conklin and Moses Hightower.
 P. J. Ochlan as Cadet Lester Shane (20 episodes), who is similar to Proctor; as Ledbetter's assistant, he spies on Casey and his friends in an attempt to discredit them and throw them out of the academy.
 Joe Flaherty as Commandant Hefilfinger (20 episodes) who is similar to Eric Lassard; he is Lassard's successor as head of the academy.
 Michael Winslow as Sergeant Larvell Jones (13 episodes)

Recurring cast 
 Larke Miller as Kendall Jackson (14 episodes)
 Tanya Wright as Cassandra Cunningham (7 episodes)

Guest stars 
 Leslie Easterbrook as District Attorney Debbie Callahan (episode 5)
 Kenneth Mars as Dr. Quackenbush (episode 9), who played a central role as the Mayor in Police Academy 6: City Under Siege
 Art Metrano as Mauser (named in this show as Sheriff Meiser) (episode 14)
 George Gaynes as Commandant Eric Lassard (episode 15)
 Bubba Smith as Captain Moses Hightower (episode 16)
 Dom DeLuise as The voice of Zeus (episode 17)
 David Graf as Captain Eugene Tackleberry (episode 21)
 Colleen Camp appears as Sergeant Kathleen Kirkland-Tackleberry through archive footage (episode 21)
 George R. Robertson as Commissioner Hurst (episode 22)
 Tim Kazurinsky as Arnold Fliegel (episode 23), who played Carl Sweetchuck in the second through fourth installments of the film series.

Episodes

References

External links 
 

1990s American police comedy television series
1990s American sitcoms
1997 American television series debuts
1998 American television series endings
1990s Canadian sitcoms
1997 Canadian television series debuts
1998 Canadian television series endings
Police Academy (franchise)
Live action television shows based on films
First-run syndicated television programs in the United States
First-run syndicated television shows in Canada
CTV Television Network original programming
CTV Comedy Channel original programming
Television series by Warner Bros. Television Studios
English-language television shows
Television series created by Paul Maslansky
Television shows filmed in British Columbia